Sivaji Bose (6 January 1925 – 24 March 2011) was an Indian cricketer. He played in 32 first-class cricket matches for Bengal and Railways.

See also
 List of Bengal cricketers

References

External links
 

1925 births
2011 deaths
Indian cricketers
Bengal cricketers
Railways cricketers
People from Mymensingh District